Dimitar Krastanov (born 31 January 1994) is a Bulgarian modern pentathlete. He competed at the 2016 Summer Olympics in Rio de Janeiro, in the men's event.

References

External links

1994 births
Living people
Bulgarian male modern pentathletes
Olympic modern pentathletes of Bulgaria
Modern pentathletes at the 2016 Summer Olympics